Roberta Groner (born January 4, 1978) is an American athlete competing in long-distance events.

Born and raised in Pittsburgh, Pennsylvania, Groner competed in running during her four years at Saint Francis University. She stopped running after she graduated, as she found she no longer enjoyed it, got married and had three children. She took up running again when she was thirty years old, running her first marathon in 2011.  Her first coach was Hector Matos, and from 2019 she was coached by Steve Magness. Her personal best on marathon is 2:29:09, from Rotterdam Marathon in April 2019. Representing the United States at the 2019 World Athletics Championships in Doha, she placed sixth in the women's marathon.

She has been a resident of Roxbury, New Jersey.

References

External links

American female marathon runners
1978 births
Living people
World Athletics Championships athletes for the United States
21st-century American women
People from Roxbury, New Jersey
Sportspeople from Morris County, New Jersey
Saint Francis University alumni
Track and field athletes from New Jersey